Kang Hyeon-mu (born 13 March 1995) is a South Korean footballer who plays as goalkeeper for Pohang Steelers.

Career
Kang Hyeon-mu was promoted to the first team of Pohang Steelers in January 2014. He made his professional debut on 12 March 2017.

References

External links 

1995 births
Living people
Association football goalkeepers
South Korean footballers
Pohang Steelers players
K League 1 players
Sportspeople from Busan